A slot drain is a linear drain used to evacuate ground water. The difference between a slot drain and the traditional trench drain is that the slot drain does not have any kind of grating. In recent years, this drainage concept is more often used in both indoor and outdoor applications, such as fire halls, car washes, landscaping, shower rooms and garages.

Fundamentally, the slot drain is another type of trench drain. Slot describes its appearance on the ground. It is preferable in areas with heavy traffic, or which require intense cleaning.

Features 
Compared to grated trench drains, the slot drain has several advantages, as it does not have any kind of grating that deteriorates, rusts or needs replacement.

Slot drains made from brick are used by architects, especially landscape architects as they usually do not want grates to appear on the ground for fountains, playgrounds and gardens.

Heavy Load Class 

If the grates on the drain deteriorate, accidents could happen when a forklift or other heavy vehicle drives on it. The grates would break and may cause injury. There are very strong grates can sustain heavy weights but they could be very expensive. The slot concept was first introduced to solve such problems. If there are no grates, there is no concern about breaking. The concrete sustains most of the weight and the slot opening is usually only 0.5" to 1.5".

Easy to clean 

To clean a grated trench drain, the grates on top must be removed. This can be difficult or frustrating if the grates are stuck, or  tools are needed to pull them up. If it is a long run trench drain, it is time consuming to remove the trench drain grates and put them back after cleaning. Slot drain can be cleaned by moving along a cleaning paddle to move the sediment into a catch basin.

Capacity of evacuating water 

It is a common misconception that flow rates are determined by open surface area alone. Other factors, such as drain material and surface material, play an important role, too.

Disadvantages 

Retrieving accidentally-dropped objects can be more difficult where a slot drain is placed, as it is not easy to put fingers through the slot and get objects back, especially when the slot opening is small. A stick or paddle may be needed to move the object to a catch basin.

Inspecting the drain body is also a concern. Some technicians may use a borescope when a detailed inspection is needed.

References

Drainage